The Healthiest State in the Nation Campaign, is a statewide effort started in Washington state in the United States in 2004 by the Washington Health Foundation (WHF), a non-partisan, non-profit organization based in Seattle, with the mission of improving health for the people of the state.

Launched on September 18, 2004, the campaign encourages improvement in six action areas by educating and engaging leaders, policymakers, businesses and the public through its interactive website at HealthiestState.org and many events throughout the year.  By emphasizing the promotion of personal responsibility and building of collective actions that make healthy choices easy, the campaign seeks to achieve the ultimate goal of moving Washington's health rank to number one.

Since 2004, the Healthiest State Campaign has become the largest civic engagement campaign for health in Washington state history, involving more than 40,000 individual champions, 1,300 businesses and organizations and 400 schools.

History
When Washington's rank in the America's Health Rankings 2003 national report dropped out of the top ten, the Washington Health Foundation (WHF) channeled its efforts toward leading a major health reform in the state.

Community Roundtables
After completing a series of polling, WHF found that Washington citizens wanted to be more involved in changing the health care system, viewing it as a shared responsibility with the government and the community.  WHF addressed these findings by holding Community Roundtables in every county of Washington, fostering discussion between public and private leaders, organizations, businesses, advocacy groups and local citizens on their common health values.

Over the span of three months, the Community Roundtables resulted in 44 meetings, 1,200 people participating and 10,000 individual responses.  WHF then had a researcher from the University of Washington analyze and condense these responses.  The result yielded nine "Key Values" – ideas of importance to the public regarding the health care system:

Assure fairness
Redesign the health system
Re-allocate existing resources
Improve health system performance and efficiency
Emphasize personal responsibility for healthy living and prevention
Seek community-based solutions
Emphasize collaboration and cooperation
Assure governmental accountability
Provide additional resources

Washington Health Leadership Summit
As a direct outgrowth of the Community Roundtables and its subsequent research, WHF coordinated the Washington Health Leadership Summit, calling together both Republican and Democrat elected officials, business leaders, citizen action groups, health and health care policymakers and concerned individuals to determine the common values that would serve as the basis for an improved health system.  The two-day event was held on October 27–28, 2003 at the Seattle Seahawks Stadium where the nine "Key Values" were presented and then prioritized via instant electronic voting after extensive discussion.  In addition to the nine "Key Values", Summit participants agreed upon adding a 10th value – to educate and engage the people of Washington state on these issues surrounding health care improvement.

These ten values formed the foundation of the Washington Health Leadership Resolution calling on Washington leaders to "set aside special interests and partisan differences" and work together to design a health care system based on the values adopted at the Summit.   Signed by more than 250 Washington leaders including Washington Governor Gary Locke, Democratic and Republican state legislators and King County Executive Ron Sims, the Resolution and its Values lay the groundwork for the creation of the Healthiest State Campaign.

The Campaign
To educate and engage the people of Washington state on health issues, the Healthiest State in the Nation Campaign was created as a long-term civic engagement effort.  Using the United Health Foundation's America's Health Rankings model as a guide, the Healthiest State Campaign was developed around six action areas, each with two health measures used in determining the state's health rank.   The campaign aimed to improve these areas through civic engagement all the while emphasizing the importance of both personal responsibility and collective action in making Washington the Healthiest State.

Healthiest State Campaign's launch and beyond
On September 18, 2004, Washington Governor Gary Locke helped launch the Healthiest State in the Nation Campaign, proclaiming the date "Washington Health Day."  With the launch, the entirety of Washington's Congressional Delegation became the first official endorsers of the campaign.

In 2005, WHF developed a web data system to more effectively engage the Washington public in the Healthiest State Campaign.  The newly developed system played a prominent role in the first Governor's Health Bowl, a statewide event sponsored by WHF and led by Washington's new Governor, Christine Gregoire.

The event was kicked off by Governor Christine Gregoire's challenge to the Washington state public to earn One Million Miles of health.  More than 17,000 individuals, 300 organizations and 115 schools took on the challenge by logging their miles of physical activity at WHF's website.  The campaign website at HealthiestState.org also awarded additional points to those who correctly answered questions about health systems in Washington.  That year, Washington state moved up one from 15th to 14th in the 2005 edition of America's Health Rankings.

2005 also marked the launch of the Healthiest State Campaign's quarterly magazine, thrive!.  Distributed through the state's Health Care Authority in libraries, universities, schools and hospitals, the magazine's circulation at its launch was 150,000 statewide.  thrive! provides readers with resources and ideas to "encourage healthier lifestyles and systems" as well as highlighting the success stories of those impacting Washington health.  Past issues have featured local celebrities like Suzy Preston, a winner on NBC's The Biggest Loser and Seattle Seahawk Shaun Alexander.

The campaign began to actively embark upon the political and policy aspects of health in 2006, developing a Healthiest State priority list andrking with the Washington State Legislature to produce laws and policies to improve Washington health.  To streamline the action in all realms of the campaign, WHF released the 2006 Report Card on Washington's Health, assessing Washington's rank in 18 health measures and outcomes which were heavily derived from America's Health Rankings.

The results of the 2006 Report Card quickly permeated all branches of the campaign, its measures becoming the focus of the 2006 Governor's Health Bowl.  Different from its previous year, the 2006 Health Bowl became a six-week event, included a 2.5 Million Mile challenge from Governor Gregoire and featured its first ever Healthiest Business Challenge sponsored by the Greater Seattle Chamber of Commerce and the Spokane Chamber of Commerce.  But the 2006 Health Bowl also retained many of its original features such as the Healthiest School Challenge, where schools across the state strove to be the school with the most miles logged.  Along with stressing the importance of physical activity, the reach of the 2006 Health Bowl broadened to highlight systemic changes that the community could take to improve Washington's health rank.  With its growing numbers in participation and partnering organizations, the annual Health Bowl quickly became the Healthiest State Campaign's signature event.

Throughout the remainder of the year, the Healthiest State Campaign has worked to address the many measures of the Report Card with events like the Heroes of Health Gala, the New Year's Resolution Challenge, the Healthy Schools Summit, the Latina Health Fair and the Spring training Challenge, all working to engage and educate the Washington public on matters of health.  In 2007, Washington state's health rank climbed to 12th from 15th in America's Health Rankings, becoming one of five states to earn the title of "most improved state."  In 2008, Washington claimed a spot in the top ten, ranking 10th in WHF's 2008 Report Card.

Healthiest State xChange
The Washington Health Foundation's Healthiest State in the Nation Campaign unveiled its latest health innovation at the start of 2011 – the Healthiest State xChange. The Healthiest State xChange offers a different approach to health insurance. One that is motivated by health, not profit.

The Healthiest State xChange is a new service designed to help individuals and businesses navigate health insurance while also directly improving the health of the people of Washington. And here's the best part – it will not cost a dime in extra money.

The premise is simple. Insurance broker fees are already built into the premium that most people (living in Washington state) pay for their health insurance, whether they know it or not. These broker fees, included in Community Rated Insurance Plans, are approved by the state. The Washington Health Foundation believes that it can use this money in a way that not only provides greater value to people buying health insurance, but also benefits the health of people across our state.

As people assign the Washington Health Foundation as their broker of record, they can be assured that their hard-earned money will not disappear into the system. Instead – WHF will use the fees to help people make better health coverage decisions, and will build a bridge that connects people and their families to a healthier lifestyle. Part of this service will be providing clients with personalized assistance as they build a Health Home – a unique set of tools that empower people to take control over their health decisions.

References

External links

Health in the United States
Health campaigns